Kawa Hesso (born August 22, 1984 in Syria) is a Syrian footballer. He currently plays for Peshmarga Erbil in Iraq.

International career
He made his debut for the Syria national team in the 2009 Nehru Cup in India. Senior national coach Fajr Ibrahim called him for the first time, and he debuted in Syria's 4–0 win over Sri Lanka on 24 August 2009. He came on as a substitute for Mosab Balhous in the second halftime.

Appearances for Syrian national team
Results list Syria's goal tally first.

W = Matches won; D = Matches drawn; L = Matches lost

Honour and Titles

Club
Al-Jaish
Syrian Premier League: 2009–10
AFC Cup: 2004

National Team
Nehru Cup: 2009 Runner-up

External links
 Career stats at Kooora.com (Arabic)
 Career stats at goalzz.com
 Career stats at national-football-teams.com

Living people
Association football goalkeepers
Syrian footballers
Kurdish sportspeople
Syria international footballers
Al-Jaish Damascus players
Taliya SC players
Syrian expatriate footballers
Expatriate footballers in Iraq
Syrian expatriate sportspeople in Iraq
Syrian Kurdish people
1984 births
Al-Qamishli
Syrian Premier League players